The 2006 Pro Bowl was the National Football League's all-star game for the 2005 season. The game was played on February 12, 2006, at Aloha Stadium in Honolulu, Hawaii. It marked the 27th consecutive time that the National Football League's all-star game was held in Honolulu. The NFC all-stars won by the score of 23 to 17.

Game summary

The start of the game was interrupted by a surprise rainstorm that lasted through the first quarter, although it ended midway through the second. Both teams' first possessions were punted away, and each of their second drives ended in interceptions; the Chicago Bears' Nathan Vasher intercepted Peyton Manning, then John Lynch picked off Matt Hasselbeck. The AFC scored first on their next drive, culminating with a 16-yard touchdown pass from Manning to Chris Chambers. After the teams traded punts, Michael Vick took over for the NFC in the second quarter, and led the team to the AFC 15-yard line, where Neil Rackers kicked a 32-yarder to make it 7–3. Manning led the AFC right back down the field, and Shayne Graham's 31-yard field goal increased the AFC's lead.

 On the NFC's next drive, Champ Bailey intercepted Vick for the AFC's second turnover (both interceptions came off passes intended for Steve Smith). However, the NFC's defense responded with another interception; this time, Darren Sharper returned the interception 35 yards to the AFC's 32-yard line.  The NFC was forced to punt it away on their next drive, however there was some controversy on the return. Jerome Mathis was set to receive the punt deep in the AFC's zone, and when the kick from Josh Bidwell came near him, he opted not to touch it. However, it glanced off his leg and rolled into the end zone, where the NFC recovered it, seemingly for a touchdown. However, the officials did not see the ball hit Mathis, and since there is no instant replay in a Pro Bowl game, NFC coach John Fox could not challenge the call. The AFC took over on their own 20, but soon afterward the NFC defense came up with another interception. Roy Williams intercepted a Manning pass and returned it 11 yards before handing it off to the Atlanta Falcons' DeAngelo Hall, who took it 57 yards to the AFC's 20. Michael Vick hit tight end Alge Crumpler with a 14-yard touchdown pass with 8 seconds left in the half to tie the score at 10–10.

Jake Delhomme of the Carolina Panthers took over at quarterback at the start of the third quarter, and hit Steve Smith, with three straight passes. The Carolina Panthers provided the NFC's team with their coaching staff, and with the Panthers' quarterback and wide receiver running the offense, the NFC moved quickly down the field. The drive stalled at midfield, and the NFC punted it away.  After the AFC's drive, led by Chiefs' quarterback Trent Green, ended in a punt, Delhomme once again moved the NFC downfield before being sacked by Casey Hampton, forcing a fumble that was recovered by the AFC's Marcus Stroud. The NFC's defense once again responded, and on the third play of the drive, Derrick Brooks returned an interception 59 yards for a touchdown that gave the NFC the lead at 17–10. After the AFC punted away their next drive, Santana Moss fumbled the ball away in AFC territory. Green led the AFC down the field again, thanks in large part to a 20-yard run by his Chiefs teammate, Larry Johnson. Green tied the game at 17–17 with a one-yard quarterback sneak. Matt Hasselbeck took over for the NFC again, and led the team on a scoring drive, ending with a 22-yard field goal by Rackers that gave the NFC the lead again. Steve McNair came in for a play at AFC quarterback, and promptly fumbled the ball away.  After the NFC punted the ball away, McNair came back and lost another fumble, giving the NFC the ball on their own 18-yard line. Following the fumble, the AFC switched to a shotgun formation. After another Rackers field goal, the AFC took over on their own 26 with 1:10 left. McNair brought the AFC to midfield, but could not get them the touchdown they needed, and the game ended on a sack by the New York Giants' Michael Strahan. Brooks was given the Most Valuable Player award.

Scoring summary
AFC – TD Chris Chambers 16 yd. pass from Peyton Manning (Shayne Graham kick) – 5:09 1st
NFC – FG Neil Rackers 32 yd. – 7:45 2nd
AFC – FG Shayne Graham 31 yd. – 3:22 2nd
NFC – TD Alge Crumpler 14 yd. pass from Michael Vick (Rackers kick) – 0:08 2nd
NFC – TD Derrick Brooks 59 yd. interception return (Rackers kick) – 5:01 3rd
AFC – TD Trent Green 1 yd. run (Graham kick) – 12:47 4th
NFC – FG Neil Rackers 22 yd. – 6:29 4th
NFC – FG Neil Rackers 20 yd. – 1:10 4th

AFC roster

Offense

Defense

Special teams

Source

NFC roster

Offense

Defense

Special teams

Source

Notes:
Replacement selection due to injury or vacancy
Injured player; selected but did not play
Replacement starter; selected as reserve
"Need player"; named by coach

Number of selections per team

Officials
 Referee: Gerald Austin
 Umpire: Steve Wilson
 Head Linesman: John Schleyer
 Line Judge: Carl Johnson
 Field Judge: Scott Steenson
 Side Judge: Laird Hayes
 Back Judge: Phil Luckett

Fan balloting
On December 19, 2005, the NFL announced that fans had cast more than 70.5 million votes via the Internet and the Sprint wireless telephone service, bettering by more than 16% the 61 million votes cast for the 2005 Pro Bowl.  Of the top ten vote-getters, all were offensive players and seven, including four of the top five, hailed from the AFC. Colts quarterback Peyton Manning led all players, garnering 1,184,142 votes, a new single-player record, and narrowly edging out Seahawks running back Shaun Alexander (1,110,575 votes) and Chargers running back LaDainian Tomlinson (1,044,360 votes).

On the defensive side, AFC players filled six of the top ten spots, though Bears middle linebacker Brian Urlacher led all defenders, earning 420,983 votes; Broncos cornerback Champ Bailey (379,477 votes), Colts defensive end Dwight Freeney (374,289 votes), and Bengals cornerback Deltha O'Neal (373,918 votes) paced the AFC.

Among NFL rookies, Buccaneers running back Carnell Williams was the leading vote-getter, receiving 219,736 votes to surpass Steelers tight end Heath Miller (217,928 votes).  Cowboys outside linebacker DeMarcus Ware (104,592 votes), Vikings punter Chris Kluwe (100,555 votes), and Bengals inside linebacker Odell Thurman (88,715 votes) rounded out the top five.

The top vote-getter at each position (as on the official NFL ballot), irrespective of conference:

Offense

Defense

Special teams

Notably, four players—Cooley, Williams, Hall, and Robert Mathis—finished first in the balloting for their respective positions among fans but failed to secure a starting or reserve spot for the game.

Entertainment
JoJo performed the national anthem. Musical group Backstreet Boys performed during halftime alongside "200 hula dancers, drummers and fire knife dancers and 400 youth performers."

Stats
Most players selected from one team was seven, tied between the AFC's Indianapolis Colts and NFC's Seattle Seahawks (a Super Bowl XL contender).
Most starters selected from one team:
AFC: Indianapolis Colts, 7 (all of the players selected)
NFC: Seattle Seahawks (Super Bowl XL contender), 5
First-time selections was big: a total of 36 were in the Pro Bowl; 20 were starters. Here's the count for first-time selections:
AFC: 16 (11 starters)
NFC: 20 (9 starters)
Of interesting note, all four special team players (punter, kicker, kick returner, and special-team player) for both conferences were first-time selections.

References

Sources

External links

 2006 AFC Pro Bowl roster
 2006 NFC Pro Bowl roster

Pro Bowl
Pro Bowl
Pro Bowl
Pro Bowl
Pro Bowl
American football competitions in Honolulu
February 2006 sports events in the United States